"Can You Help Me" is a song written and performed by American contemporary R&B musician Jesse Johnson, issued as the second single from his debut studio album Jesse Johnson's Revue. The song peaked at #3 on the Billboard R&B chart in 1985.

Chart positions

References

External links
 

1985 songs
1985 singles
A&M Records singles
Jesse Johnson (musician) songs
Songs written by Jesse Johnson (musician)